Marmette may refer to:

People
Joseph Marmette (1844–1895), Canadian novelist and historian
Marie-Louise Marmette (1870–1928), French-Canadian author and lecturer

Places
Marmette Lake, freshwater body in Canada